"Statue of Liberty" is a 1978 single by XTC. It was recorded at Abbey Road Studios, London and subsequently banned by the BBC for the lyrics "In my fantasy I sail beneath your skirt". XTC performed the song on the BBC2 television show The Old Grey Whistle Test in 1978.

Music video

The music video for "Statue of Liberty" shows the band performing the song in a black room while cardboard cutouts of the Statue of Liberty holds up the microphones for the band. At the end, keyboard player Barry Andrews lifts up his keyboard and walks around the room holding it. The video was released on the Look Look video compilation.

Personnel
Andy Partridge – guitar and vocals
Barry Andrews – steam piano, clapped out organs
Colin Moulding – bass and vocals
Terry Chambers – drums and vocals

References

External links
 "Statue of Liberty" on Chalkhills
 

1978 singles
Songs written by Andy Partridge
XTC songs
Statue of Liberty
1978 songs
Virgin Records singles
Obscenity controversies in music
Songs banned by the BBC